The Askafroa also known as the Danish Askefrue and German Eschenfrau, is a type of legendary creature in Scandinavian and German folklore, similar to the Greek Hamadryads. The Askafroa is the guardian of the ash tree. The Askafroa was thought be a malicious creature which did much damage, and to propitiate her it was necessary to make a sacrifice to her on Ash Wednesday.

The Swedish scholar Hyltén-Cavallius recorded in his ethnographic work Wärend och Wirdarne a belief of a female creature living in the ash tree, in Ljunit Hundred. The elders used to sacrifice to the Askafroa on the morning of Ash Wednesday. Before the sun had risen, they poured water over the roots of the ash tree. While doing this they said: "Nu offrar jag, så gör du oss ingen skada" meaning "Now I sacrifice [to you], so that you do us no harm". Hyltén-Cavallius further writes that they believed that if anyone broke branches or twigs from the ash tree, they would become ill.

Popular culture
 The online role-playing game Dark Age of Camelot features enemies in the form of Askefruer/Askafroa.

See also
 Elder Mother
 Sacred trees and groves in Germanic paganism and mythology

References

Bibliography 
 
 
 

Scandinavian legendary creatures
German legendary creatures
Germanic legendary creatures
Female legendary creatures